The Mink Coat Killa is the sixth studio album by American rapper Jarren Benton. It was released on June 23, 2017, on Benton's independent record label "Benton Enterprises".

Background 
The song "C.R.E.A.M. 17" was described as Wu-Tang-inspired. It is Benton's first project since nearly a year. Consisting of 15 songs, the album features several collaborations.

Track listing

References

2017 albums
Jarren Benton albums